Vazli (also Romanized as Vazlī) is a village in Sirvan Rural District, Nowsud District, Paveh County, Kermanshah Province, Iran. At the 2006 census, its population was 123, in 34 families.

References 

Populated places in Paveh County